Justin Newcombe, is a New Zealand freelance writer, garden designer, and landscaper. He has appeared in several NZ Gardening shows and has released his own Gardening book 'The Kiwi Back Yard Handbook'.

Television
 Hearts
 Get Growing
 Full Frontage
 The Get Growing Roadshow

Books
 The Kiwi Back Yard Handbook

References

External links
 Justin Newcombe Official Website

Living people
New Zealand gardeners
New Zealand non-fiction writers
Year of birth missing (living people)